Jaimee Sarah Provan-Claxton (born 3 February 1978) is a field hockey forward from New Zealand, who represented her native country in 2 Olympic Games: the 2004 Summer Olympics in Athens, Greece- here she finished in sixth place with the Women's National Team. She also competed in the 2008 Beijing Olympics. As well as representing NZ at the 2002 Commonwealth Games. Provan made her international senior debut for the Black Sticks in 2001 and retired in 2008 with 145 international test caps. She was born in Christchurch.
Since retiring from hockey, Jaimee became a tv personality before moving to Europe with her husband. She now lives in France with their 3 kids. Jaimee launched her own website design & development business in 2019 called Website Restyle

International senior competitions
 2001 – Champions Trophy, Amstelveen
 2002 – Champions Trophy, Macau
 2002 – Commonwealth Games, Manchester
 2002 – World Cup, Perth
 2003 – Champions Challenge, Catania
 2004 – Olympic Qualifying Tournament, Auckland
 2004 – Olympic Games, Athens
 2005 – Champions Challenge, Virginia Beach
 2008 – Olympic Games, Beijing

References
 New Zealand Field Hockey

External links
 

New Zealand female field hockey players
Field hockey players at the 2004 Summer Olympics
Field hockey players at the 2008 Summer Olympics
Olympic field hockey players of New Zealand
Field hockey players from Christchurch
1978 births
Living people
Field hockey players at the 2002 Commonwealth Games
Commonwealth Games competitors for New Zealand
20th-century New Zealand women
21st-century New Zealand women